Events from the year 1695 in France.

Incumbents 
Monarch: Louis XIV

Events
 
 
 
 
 
 August 13–15 – Nine Years' War: Bombardment of Brussels by French troops.
 September 1 – Nine Years' War: France surrenders Namur in the Spanish Netherlands to forces of the Grand Alliance led by King William III of England following the 2-month Siege of Namur.

Births
 May 2 – Giovanni Niccolò Servandoni, French architect and painter (d. 1766)
 May 3 – Henri Pitot, French engineer (d. 1771)
 August 26 – Marie-Anne-Catherine Quinault, singer and composer (d. 1793)

Deaths
 

 January 4 – François-Henri de Montmorency, duc de Luxembourg, Marshal of France (b. 1628)
 April 13 – Jean de la Fontaine, French writer noted for his fables (b. 1621)
 June 11 – André Félibien, French architect (b. 1619)
 November 16 – Pierre Nicole, French Jansensist (b. 1625)
 December 8 – Barthélemy d'Herbelot de Molainville, French orientalist (b. 1625)

See also

References

1690s in France